Scott Holstein (born May 5, 1974) is an American country and bluegrass singer-songwriter.

Holstein was born in Boone County, West Virginia and lives in Nashville, Tennessee. His bluegrass and country music is influenced by Ralph Stanley, Larry Sparks, and Keith Whitley. He writes his own music, and he is a baritone singer. He released his first full-length album, Cold Coal Town, in 2011. Contributing artists include Don Rigsby of the Lonesome River Band, Grammy Award winner Randy Kohrs, Clay Hess of Ricky Skaggs & Kentucky Thunder, Aaron Ramsey of Mountain Heart, Jay Weaver, Tim Crouch and Scott Vestal from the Sam Bush Band.

Discography

Cold Coal Town, Coal Records, Nashville, 2011

References

External links 
 http://www.scottholsteinmusic.com
 http://www.allmusic.com/artist/scott-holstein-mn0002683818
 http://www.cmt.com/artists/scott-holstein/biography
 http://www.wvmusichalloffame.com/nominees.html

1974 births
Living people
People from Boone County, West Virginia
American country singer-songwriters
American bluegrass musicians
American baritones
21st-century American singers
21st-century American male singers
American male singer-songwriters
Singer-songwriters from West Virginia